The Whitewater Passenger Depot is a historic railway station located at 301 W. Whitewater Street in Whitewater, Wisconsin. The station was built in 1891 to serve the Chicago, Milwaukee, St. Paul and Pacific Railroad, also known as the Milwaukee Road. Railroad architect J. T. W. Jennings designed the station with influences from Richardsonian Romanesque and High Victorian Gothic styles. Passenger train service to the station ended on November 29, 1951.

The station was added to the National Register of Historic Places on June 12, 2013.

References

Railway stations on the National Register of Historic Places in Wisconsin
Railway stations in the United States opened in 1891
Former Chicago, Milwaukee, St. Paul and Pacific Railroad stations
Former railway stations in Wisconsin
National Register of Historic Places in Walworth County, Wisconsin
Railway stations closed in 1951
1891 establishments in Wisconsin